Katta Subramanya Naidu(born 1960) is an Indian (Karnataka) politician with the Bharatiya Janata Party.  In 2008, he won the state legislature elections from
Hebbal constituency in the Bangalore area, and was a minister under B. S. Yeddyurappa. Previously he had won from Shivajinagar in 1999 and 2004 elections.

References

1960 births
Living people
Bharatiya Janata Party politicians from Karnataka
Indian government officials
Karnataka MLAs 2004–2007
Karnataka MLAs 2008–2013